Murad Abu Anza (born November 8, 1986) is an Arab-Israeli footballer who currently plays for Nordia Jerusalem. He also had loan spells in F.C. Ashdod and Maccabi Petah Tikva.

2013 Instagram Incident
In December 2013, after a match between Hapoel Bnei Lod and Maccabi Netanya, Abu Anza uploaded a selfie to his Instagram account showing bruises he claimed to have gotten during the match, and added in the photo description, referring to the match referee, Halim Zatme: "Halim Zatme son of a b**** and has no respect". In an unprecedented move, the IFA suspended Abu Anza for 4 matches over the comment.

Honours
Liga Leumit
Runner-up (1): 2011–12
Liga Leumit top scorer
Winner (1): 2011–12
Runner-up (1): 2010–11

Statistics

References

1986 births
Living people
Israeli footballers
Arab citizens of Israel
Arab-Israeli footballers
Bedouin Israelis
Israeli Muslims
Footballers from Rahat
Maccabi Kiryat Gat F.C. players
Hapoel Bnei Lod F.C. players
Maccabi Petah Tikva F.C. players
F.C. Ashdod players
Hapoel Acre F.C. players
Maccabi Ahi Nazareth F.C. players
Hapoel Umm al-Fahm F.C. players
Maccabi Ironi Tamra F.C. players
Nordia Jerusalem F.C. players
Liga Leumit players
Israeli Premier League players
Association football forwards